German submarine U-348 was a Type VIIC U-boat of Nazi Germany's Kriegsmarine during World War II.

She carried out six patrols but sank no ships.

She was sunk near Hamburg by US bombs.

Design
German Type VIIC submarines were preceded by the shorter Type VIIB submarines. U-348 had a displacement of  when at the surface and  while submerged. She had two shafts and two  propellers.

U-348 was fitted with five  torpedo tubes (four fitted at the bow and one at the stern), fourteen torpedoes, one  SK C/35 naval gun, 220 rounds, and two twin  C/30 anti-aircraft guns. The boat had a complement of between forty-four and sixty.

Service history
The submarine was laid down on 17 November 1942 at the Nordseewerke yard at Emden as yard number 220, launched on 25 June 1943 and commissioned on 10 August under the command of Oberleutnant zur See Hans-Norbert Schunck.

U-348 served with the 8th U-boat Flotilla, for training and then with the 9th flotilla for operations from 1 April 1944. She came back under the command of the 8th flotilla on 12 July and was reassigned to the 5th flotilla on 16 February 1945; she stayed with that organization until her destruction on 30 March.

U-348 made short trips from Kiel in Germany to Stavanger, Kristiansand and Bergen in Norway in April 1944.

First, second, and third patrols
Her first patrol began with her departure from Bergen on 23 April 1944. The detonation of a landmine near Stavanger on 6 May killed one man and wounded another. She returned to Bergen on the 15th.

The submarine's second foray was uneventful.

U-348s third patrol was preceded by more short trips, this time between Trondheim, Kiel and Reval, (now Tallinn, Estonia).

Fourth, fifth and sixth patrols
The boat's fourth sortie was divided into three parts in July and August 1944, but kept to the Ostsee (Baltic).

Patrol number five was sub-divided into four. It included departures from Helsinki in Finland and Reval and arrivals at Mösholm and Libau (now Liepāja, Latvia).

Her sixth patrol from Danzig (now Gdańsk, Poland) terminated in Swinemünde (now Świnoujście, Poland).

Fate
She moved from Swinemünde to Hamburg in February 1945. On 30 March she was destroyed by US bombs during an air-raid.

References

Notes

Citations

Bibliography

External links

German Type VIIC submarines
U-boats commissioned in 1943
U-boats sunk in 1945
U-boats sunk by US aircraft
World War II submarines of Germany
1943 ships
Ships built in Emden
Maritime incidents in March 1945